William Grigg may refer to:

 William Grigg (Master of Clare College, Cambridge) (died 1726), Master of Clare 1713–1726
 Will Grigg (born 1991), Northern Irish footballer
 William Norman Grigg (1963–2017), writer

See also
William Griggs (disambiguation)